Statistics of Soviet Top League for the 1974 season.

Overview
It was contested by 16 teams, and Dynamo Kyiv won the championship.

League standings

Results

Top scorers
20 goals
 Oleg Blokhin (Dynamo Kyiv)

16 goals
 Anatoli Ionkin (Kairat)
 Vadim Pavlenko (Dynamo Moscow)

13 goals
 Vladimir Makarov (Chornomorets Odessa)

12 goals
 Vadim Nikonov (Torpedo Moscow)

11 goals
 Mikhail An (Pakhtakor)
 Anatoly Baidachny (Dynamo Moscow)
 Vladimir Onischenko (Dynamo Kyiv)
 Vitali Starukhin (Shakhtar)

10 goals
 Vladimir Danilyuk (Karpaty)
 Aleksandr Piskaryov (Spartak Moscow)

References
Soviet Union - List of final tables (RSSSF)

1969
1
Soviet
Soviet